Narraguagus Bay is a bay in Washington County, Maine.

Located at the mouth of the Narraguagus River between the towns of Harrington and Milbridge, it is separated from Harrington Bay to the northeast by Fastet Island and Pleasant Bay to the east by Dyer Island.

The bay extends roughly 4.5 mi. (7 km) and is 2 mi. (3 km) at its widest.

Bays of Washington County, Maine
Bays of Maine